Ruth Rayman is a retired Canadian engineer. She was the director general of the Advanced Electronics and Photonics Research Centre at the National Research Council of Canada, and the president of the Canadian Photonics Consortium.

Education 
Rayman obtained her bachelor of Engineering Physics and Management at McMaster University in 1984. She went on to complete her Master of Business Administration at the University of Ottawa, graduating in 1991. In 2015, she obtained an Executive Certificate in Leadership from the MIT Sloan School of Management.

Career 
Rayman began her career at Bell Northern Research working with photonics.  

From 2003 to 2005, she was the President of the Canadian Photonics Consortium. She also held senior management positions at RCA Electro-Optics, Nortel Networks and Lumonics.

In 2007, she joined the National Research Council Canada, and was the Director General of the Advanced Electronics and Photonics Research Centre. Her work included collaborative research to develop integrated photonics and printable electronics. She retired from her position at the NRC in 2021.

Currently, Rayman is a member of:

 Scientific Advisory Committee of the National Optics Institute (INO)
 Carleton University’s Photonics and Laser Technology Program Advisory Committee
 Canadian Photonic Industry Consortium's Board of Directors 
 Invest Ottawa’s Global Expansion Committee

Awards 
Since 2005, Rayman has been a Warden of the Iron Ring in recognition of her efforts to promote women in STEM fields. In 2017, she was chosen as one of McMaster University's top 150 engineering alumni.

References 

McMaster University alumni
University of Ottawa alumni
Year of birth missing (living people)
Living people
21st-century Canadian engineers
MIT Sloan School of Management alumni
20th-century Canadian engineers
Nortel people
Canadian women engineers